The Twin River is a tributary of the Iskut River in the northwest part of the province of British Columbia, Canada. The river's watershed's land cover is classified as 77.2% snow/glacier, 9.8% barren, 4.5% conifer forest, and small amounts of other cover.

The Twin River is in the traditional territory of the Tlingit, specifically the Shtax'héen Ḵwáan, commonly known as the Stikine River people. It is also in the asserted traditional territory of the Tahltan First Nation and Iskut First Nation, of the Tahltan people.

Geography
The Twin River originates from the meltwaters of Twin Glacier, a valley glacier that flows from the Andrei Icefield which dominates the mountains north of Twin River and from which numerous glaciers extend in all directions. This large glacial field is named after the son of Olav Mokievsky-Zubok, a glaciologist who carried out significant glaciological work in the Coast Mountains from the 1960s to the 1970s.

From Twin Glacier the Twin River flows south through glacial meltwater lakes, then through a coastal western hemlock forest. This lobe surrounds the northwestern base of Hoodoo Mountain. Although the forks are similar in size and flow, Canadian NTS topographic maps and databases like BC Geographical Names identify the east fork as the Twin River while leaving the west fork unnamed. From the confluence of the two forks, the Twin River continues south through an increasingly braided channel before emptying into the Iskut River.

See also
 List of British Columbia rivers

References 

Cassiar Land District
Rivers of British Columbia
Rivers of the Boundary Ranges
Stikine Country
Tahltan
Tlingit